An alternative lifestyle is a lifestyle perceived to be outside the norm for a given culture. The phrase "alternative lifestyle" is often used pejoratively. Description of a related set of activities as alternative is a defining aspect of certain subcultures.

History 
Alternative lifestyles and subcultures were first highlighted in the U.S. in the 1920s with the "flapper" movement. Women cut their hair and skirts short (as a symbol of freedom from oppression and the old ways of living). These women were the first large group of females to practice pre-marital sex, dancing, cursing, and driving in modern America without the ostracism that had occurred in earlier instances, such as the Church of Jesus Christ of Latter-day Saints.

The American press in the 1970s frequently used the term "alternative lifestyle" as a euphemism for homosexuality and for those perceived as hippies. Both groups were seen as threatening to the social order.

Examples 

The following is a non-exhaustive list of activities in the U.S. that have been described as alternative lifestyles:
 A Stanford University cooperative house, Synergy, was founded in 1972 with the theme of "exploring alternative lifestyles".
 Alternative child-rearing, such as homeschooling, coparenting, and home births
 Environmentally-conscious ways of eating, such as veganism, freeganism, or raw foodism
 Living in non-traditional communities, such as communes, intentional communities, ecovillages, off-the-grid, or the tiny house movement
 Traveling subcultures, including lifestyle travellers, digital nomads, housetruckers, and New Age travellers
 Countercultural movements and alternative subcultures such as Bohemianism, punk rock, emo, metal music subculture, antiquarian steampunk, hippies, and vampires
 Body modification, including tattoos, body piercings, eye tattooing, scarification, non-surgical stretching like ears or genital stretching, and transdermal implants
 Nudism and clothing optional lifestyles
 Non-normative sexual lifestyles and gender identity-based subcultures, such as BDSM, LGBT culture, cross-dressing, transvestism, polyamory, cruising, swinging, down-low, and certain types of sexual fetishism, roleplays, or paraphilias
 Adherents to alternative spiritual and religious communities, such as Freemasons, Ordo Templi Orientis, Thelemites, Satanists, Modern Pagans, and New Age communities
 Certain traditional religious minorities, such as Anabaptist Christians (most notably Amish, Mennonites, Hutterites, the Bruderhof Communities, and Schwarzenau Brethren) and ultra-Orthodox Jews, who pursue simple living alongside a non-technological or anti-technology lifestyle
 Secular anti-technology communities called neo-Luddites

See also
 Alternative culture
 Alternative housing
 Intentional living
 Lebensreform
 Straight edge
 Teetotalism
 Temperance movement
 Underground culture

References 

1920s introductions
Deviance (sociology)
Lifestyle
 
Philosophy of life
Subcultures